Narestan Rural District is in Aqda District of Ardakan County, Yazd province, Iran. At the National Census of 2006, its population was 1,526 in 481 households. There were 1,552 inhabitants in 513 households at the following census of 2011. At the most recent census of 2016, the population of the rural district was 1,741 in 595 households. The largest of its 58 villages was Hasanabad, with 935 people.

References 

Ardakan County

Rural Districts of Yazd Province

Populated places in Yazd Province

Populated places in Ardakan County